Metriotes jaeckhi is a moth of the family Coleophoridae. It is found in France, Portugal and Spain.

References

Coleophoridae
Moths of Europe
Moths described in 1985